The 2014 Liga Nusantara season is the first edition of Liga Nusantara after the Second Division and Third Division merged on 2014 season. After removal of Badan Liga Sepakbola Amatir Indonesia (BLAI) Liga Nusantara as amateur competition this season is managed by competition committee of Province Association for qualification round and managed by PSSI in national round.

The competition starts on 4 May 2014 and finish in national final match by 14 December 2014. Persatu Tuban became the champion after beating Laga FC 2-1 in the final.

Format
Preliminary round held by the respective provincial associations. All clubs must play with a home away system, with a standard number of games that run every club must be at least 15 games per season.

Regional round is divided into 6 regional: Sumatra, Java, Borneo, Bali-Nusa, Sulawesi-Maluku, Papua. System home tournament with a round robin format. 2 clubs from each region will qualify for the national round.

National round total of 16 clubs who competed consists of 12 clubs qualify from the regional round as well as four clubs rank 3, 4, 5 and 6 in 2014 First Division. Systems home tournament with a round robin format. The top 6 club gets ticket promotion to the Premier Division next season.

Each team can register one foreign player in this competition.

Teams
The league is scheduled to follow various amateur clubs in all provinces in Indonesia. Recruitment club in this league handed to each Provincial Association (Asprov).

If there are 10 amateur clubs included in one province, then only one club that represents the province to the national round. Likewise onwards, with multiples of 10 to 1. If the province has 20 amateur clubs, it would have taken two teams to qualify for the national round. If there are provinces that have less than 10 amateur clubs, the representative from the province will follow the playoffs with representatives from other provinces.

Preliminary round
Divided into 33 to 34 provincial league play since May 2014.

Sumatra Region
Divided into 10 provincial league:

Java Region
Divided into 6 provincial league:

Kalimantan Region
Divided into 5 provincial league:

Sulawesi-Maluku Region
Divided into 8 provincial league:

Nusa Tenggara Region
Divided into 3 provincial league:

Papua Region
Divided into 2 provincial league:

Regional round
Followed by the best teams from every province in Indonesia. This round divided into 6 regional tournament. Two best teams in each region qualify for national round.

Play off
Play On 27 October 2014 1st Leg and 31 October 2014 2nd Leg

Group stage
24 teams from the regional round will compete. Matches for the Group stage will be played from 9–13 November 2014.

Group 1
Matches were played in Citra Mas Stadium, Batam.

Group 2
Matches were played in Depati Amir Stadium, Pangkal Pinang.

Group 3
Matches were played in Si Jalak Harupat Stadium, Bandung Regency.

Group 4
Matches were played in Brantas Stadium, Batu, Malang.

Group 5
Matches were played in A. Yani Stadium, Sumenep.

Group 6
Matches were played in Mandala Stadium, Jayapura.

National round 
Sixteen teams will play in this round including four teams from the fourth round of First Division. Top six teams will be promoted to the 2015 Premier Division.

First round 
This stage will use home tournament format and will be played from 23–27 November 2014.

Group 7 
 Matches were played in Maulana Yusuf Stadium, Serang.

Group 8 
 Matches were played in Satria Stadium, Purwokerto.

Group 9 
Matches were played in Surajaya Stadium, Lamongan.

Group 10 
Matches were played in Brantas Stadium, Batu, Malang.

Second round 
This round will be played in Yogyakarta. Matches will be played from 4–10 December 2014.

Group 11

Group 12

Knockout stage 
Semifinal matches will be played on December 12, 2014 and the final match will be played on December 14, 2014, also in Yogyakarta.

Semifinals

Third-placed

Final

Champions

References

 
Liga 3 (Indonesia) seasons
3